Southern hake is a common name for several fishes and may refer to:

Merluccius australis, native to the south Pacific Ocean
, native to the north Atlantic Ocean

Fish common names